Edom Store and Post Office, also known as John Chrisman Store and Myers and Company, is a historic store and post office located at Edom, Rockingham County, Virginia. It was built about 1835, and is a two-story, brick commercial building.  It features a metal-sheathed gable roof, a five-bay façade with center entries on the first and second stories, and a one-story entry porch and a storefront added in the late-19th century. It has a two-story rear ell. The interior is transitional Federal-Greek Revival.  Also on the property is a contributing frame barn dated to about 1900.  The Edom Post Office operated out of the store until the late 1930s and the store closed about 1940.

It was listed on the National Register of Historic Places in 2007.

References

Commercial buildings on the National Register of Historic Places in Virginia
Federal architecture in Virginia
Greek Revival architecture in Virginia
Commercial buildings completed in 1835
Buildings and structures in Rockingham County, Virginia
National Register of Historic Places in Rockingham County, Virginia